CA112 can refer to:
Air China Flight 112
California State Route 112